Paolo Panelli (January 2, 1656 – Jauanary 6, 1759) was an Italian painter of the Late-Baroque, active in mainly in Verona.

He trained first with his father, but later in life studied with Santo Prunato; he also later learned engraving from Robert van Oudenard. He painted a St Joseph in Prison for the Oratory of San Biagio of Verona and for the church of the Monache di San Domenico. Giovanni Battista Buratto was his pupil.

References

1656 births
1759 deaths
17th-century Italian painters
Italian male painters
18th-century Italian painters
Painters from Verona
Italian Baroque painters
18th-century Italian male artists